Richard Burkewood Welbourn, FRCS (1 May 1919 in Rainhill, Lancashire – 3 August 2005 in Reading, Berkshire) was a British scientist and educator, specializing in surgical endocrinology. He was Professor and Chairman of the Department of Surgery at the Royal Postgraduate Medical School, Hammersmith Hospital.

Career
Welbourn attended Rugby School, Emmanuel College, Cambridge and Liverpool University, graduating in 1942. After graduating he worked as a Casualty Officer at the Royal Southern Hospital. In January 1943 he joined the Royal Army Medical Corps Field Dressing Station, which followed the D-day landings in the Low Countries and France.

In 1951, he earned a Fulbright scholarship to the Mayo Clinic. He joined the staff of Queen's University, Belfast (QUB) in 1952. In 1958 he was named as Professor of Surgical Science. In 1962 he was invited to the Royal Postgraduate Medical School, Hammersmith Hospital and garnered attention for his work on phaeochromocytoma.

Publications
 Clinical Endocrinology for Surgeons (1963)
 Medical and Surgical Endocrinology (1975; co-written with Professor D. Montgomery)
 The Dictionary of Medical Ethics (1977; co-edited with Prof. A. Duncan and Prof. G. Dunstan)

Affiliations
 Fellow, Royal College of Surgeons
 President, Surgical Research Society
 President, British Association of Endocrine Surgeons
 President, International Surgical Group
 Vice-President, Institute of Medical Ethics and the Section of Surgery, RSM
 Visiting Research Fellow, UCLA (1990, where he wrote The History of Endocrine Surgery

Awards
The Distinguished Service Award of the International Association of Endocrine Surgeons (Stockholm, 1991)

References

External links
 "Richard Welbourn Dies: Pioneer And Historian Of Endocrine Surgergy; source: The Independent (London; 14 September 2005)
 Journal of the History of Medicine and Allied Sciences Online (subscription required)

1919 births
2005 deaths
Military personnel from Lancashire
British Army personnel of World War II
Academics of Queen's University Belfast
Alumni of the University of Liverpool
British medical writers
British scientists
British endocrinologists
People from Rainhill
People from Reading, Berkshire
Fellows of the Royal College of Surgeons
Alumni of Emmanuel College, Cambridge
Royal Army Medical Corps soldiers
People educated at Rugby School